The Lycée Victor Hugo is a French international school in Florence, Italy. It was established in 1976 and has integrated the Mission laïque française (Mlf) in 2007. It serves levels maternelle (preschool) through terminale, the final year of lycée (senior high school) and it allows French, English and Italian languages learning from preschool for all children. As of 2017 the school has about 500 students range from 2 to 18 years.

Palazzo Venturi Ginori

The Lycée is located in the palace once known as the Palazzo Venturi Ginori, built in 1498 for Bernardo Rucellai on land owned by his wife Nannina Medici. In 1459, Cosimo de' Medici sponsors meetings of a neoplatonic Academy in this palace. The palace suffered with the temporary expulsion of the Medici in 1527, but was soon refurbished. In 1537, the Rucellai heirs sold the property to Bianca Cappello. In 1663, the Cardinal Giovanni Carlo Medici sells much of the contents of the palace, and the structure is bought by the Marquis Ridolfi Montescudaio. The palace interiors were refurbished in the early 19th century in a neoclassical style. The gardens were redone in a British style. In 1861, an owner, Countess Orloff employs Giuseppe Poggi in renovations.

See also
 Agency for French Education Abroad
 Education in France
 International school
 Institut français de Florence
 List of international schools
 Mission laïque française
 Multilingualism
 Victor Hugo

References

External links
 
 

French international schools in Italy
Schools in Florence
Trilingual schools
Cambridge schools in Italy
Educational institutions established in 1976
1976 establishments in Italy
AEFE contracted schools
Mission laïque française